Suraposht (also Romanized as Sūrāposht and Sūrā Pesht; also known as Sor Poshteh, Sūreh Posht, Sūreh Poshteh, and Surekh-Pushtekh) is a village in Tula Rud Rural District, in the Central District of Talesh County, Gilan Province, Iran. At the 2006 census, its population was 899, in 222 families.

References 

Populated places in Talesh County